Robert Mensah Sports Stadium is a multi-use stadium in Tema, Ghana.  It is used mostly for football matches and is the home stadium of Tema Youth and Real Sportive. The stadium holds 5,000 peole. It was an artificial pitch used for training during the 2008 Africa Cup of Nations.

Football venues in Ghana
Tema